Naradhiwas Rajanagarindra Hospital is the main hospital of Narathiwat Province, Thailand and is classified under the Ministry of Public Health as a general hospital. It has a CPIRD Medical Education Center which trains doctors for the Faculty of Medicine of Princess of Naradhiwas University.

History 
Mom Rajawongse Taweewong Thawansak, then governor of Narathiwat Province, saw that Narathiwat being a province in the far south of Thailand, did not receive satisfactory healthcare as other provinces in the country. He cooperated with Luang Charoon Burakij, his successor as governor in building a two-storey building  named "Taweecharoon" which acted as a health station and opened on 24 June 1941, with two full-time doctors working. Over time, the health station was expanded in 1952 and became a hospital, named Narathiwat Hospital and its first hospital director was Dr. Sem Pringpuangkaeo, former director of the Women's Hospital (now Rajavithi Hospital). Under the National Social and Economic Development Plan, the hospital became classified as a general hospital. On 28 February 1997, the hospital was renamed "Naradhiwas Rajanagarindra Hospital" (Princess of Naradhiwas Hospital), after King Bhumibol Adulyadej bestowed the royal title of the Princess of Naradhiwas to his majesty's sister, Princess Galyani Vadhana in 1995.

See also 
 Healthcare in Thailand
 Hospitals in Thailand
 List of hospitals in Thailand

References 

 The article incorporates material from the corresponding article in the Thai wikipedia.

Hospitals in Thailand
Narathiwat province